Ian R. MacLeod (born 1956) is a British science fiction and fantasy writer.

He was born in Solihull near Birmingham. He studied law and worked as a civil servant before going freelance in early 1990s soon after he started publishing stories, attracting critical praise and awards nominations.

Writings
He is the author of seven novels, including The Light Ages and The House of Storms, which are set in an alternate universe nineteenth century England, where aether, a substance that can be controlled by the mind, has ossified English society into guilds and has retarded technological progress. His other novels and short stories feature a mixture of fantastic, historical, and futuristic elements, combined with a concern for character and vividly descriptive writing. His novel Song of Time, told from a viewpoint of a classical violinist and set in the near future, won the Arthur C. Clarke Award for Year's Best SF Novel, and his novel Wake up and Dream, set in an alternative 1940s Los Angeles, won Sidewise Award for Best Alternative History. His novel Red Snow follows the path of a vampire across several centuries in Europe and the United States.

MacLeod's novella "The Summer Isles" (Asimov's Science Fiction October/November 1998) won the Sidewise Award for Alternate History, Short Form and the World Fantasy Award for Best Novella.  It is an alternate history where Britain, having been defeated in the World War I, develops its own form of fascism in 1930s. The narrator is a closeted homosexual Oxford historian who had known the leader in youth. It was written as a novel, which however could not sell; MacLeod published the cut version, with the full-length version only being published in a limited edition in 2005. This novel version also won the Sidewise Award for Alternate History, Long Form, thus becoming the only story to win the same award twice in two differing formats, novel and novella.

MacLeod won the World Fantasy Award again in for his 2000 novelette "The Chop Girl". His shorter fiction has been collected in Voyages by Starlight, Breathmoss and Other Exhalations, Past Magic, Journeys, and the Frost on Glass.

MacLeod was Guest of Honour at the 38th Novacon, held in November 2008.

Bibliography

Novels 
 
The Light Ages (Earthlight imprint of Simon & Schuster, 2003) (2004 nomination for World Fantasy Award)
The House of Storms (Simon & Schuster, 2005)
The Summer Isles (Aio Publishing, 2005) (2005 Sidewise Award) Expanded version of the original 1998 novella, which also won the award.
Song of Time (PS Publishing, 2008) (2009 Arthur C. Clarke Award, 2009 John W. Campbell Memorial Award)
Wake Up and Dream (PS Publishing, 2011) (2011 Sidewise Award)
Red Snow (2017, PS Publishing)

Short fiction 
Collections
Voyages by Starlight (1996, Arkham House)
 Breathmoss and Other Exhalations (2004, Golden Gryphon Press)
 Past Magic (2006, PS Publishing)
 Journeys (2010, Subterranean Press)
 Snodgrass and Other Illusions: The Best Short Stories of Ian R. MacLeod (Open Road Media, 2013)
 Frost on Glass (2015, PS Publishing)
 Everywhere (JABberwocky, ebook collection volume 1. 2019)
 Nowhere (JABberwocky, ebook collection volume 2. 2019)
Stories

References

External links
 Official website
Breathmoss and Other Exhalations at Golden Gryphon Press; excerpt and links to reviews
 Ian MacLeod information at Aio Publishing website, includes excerpt, links and further materials
 Ian R. MacLeod's online fiction at Free Speculative Fiction Online
 
 Story behind Snodgrass by Ian R MacLeod - In From the Cold at Upcoming4.me
 Art, Science and a little Magic - Ian R MacLeod looks back on why he writes - Online Essay at Upcoming4.me

Interviews
Interview with Jay Tomio (2005)
Interview at Infinity Plus
Interview  at scifi.com
Interview at sfsite.com
Interview at sageandsavant.com (2017)
 

1956 births
Living people
Asimov's Science Fiction people
British alternative history writers
British fantasy writers
British science fiction writers
People from Solihull
Sidewise Award winners
World Fantasy Award-winning writers
English male novelists